Stephen Cade Hetherington  (born 1959) is an Australian analytic philosopher specialising in epistemology and, to a lesser extent, metaphysics, an emeritus professor in the School of Humanities and Languages at the University of New South Wales, a prolific author, and one of the longest-serving editors-in-chief of the Australasian Journal of Philosophy.

Family

Early life
The son of the Australian artist, caricaturist, cartoonist, and puppeteer, Norman Frederick Hetherington  (1921–2010), and Margaret "Peggy" Hetherington (1923–2022), née Owrid, née Purnell, Stephen Cade Hetherington was born at Sydney in 1959.

He grew up in Mosman, New South Wales, where his father's puppetry collection and workshop were located in the basement beneath the family residence.

Marriage
He married the artist Parveen Kaur Seehra in 1990.

Education
He attended the opportunity classes (years 5 and 6) at Neutral Bay Public School and, then, attended the academically selective Fort Street High School in Sydney (as had his father, Norman).

He received his tertiary education from the University of Sydney, from New College at the University of Oxford, and from the University of Pittsburgh.
 University of Sydney: Bachelor of Arts (B.A.) (Honours Class I), 1981.
 University of Oxford, New College: Bachelor of Philosophy (B.Phil.), 1983.
 University of Pittsburgh: Master of Arts (M.A.), 1986.
 University of Pittsburgh: Doctor of Philosophy (Ph.D.), 1987.

Puppeteer

In the four years (1977 to 1980) that he studied at the University of Sydney, Hetherington not only operated marionettes part-time in his father's special, highly successful dental health programme for children ("Smiley's Good Teeth Puppet Theatre"), but also spoke to the children before and after each show. His part in this programme ceased when he went to Oxford to continue his studies.

Author
His first four publications were written while he was still a student; the first two (Hetherington, 1983a; 1984a), written as an undergraduate student, were derived from papers written for his Honours-year coursework at the University of Sydney, and the other two (Hetherington, 1984b; 1988) were written as a post-graduate student during his time at the University of Pittsburgh.

He became a well-respected, prolific author in a wide range of philosophical domains, especially epistemology:

Academic
He commenced his academic career in 1987, as an Assistant Professor of Philosophy at West Virginia University; and in 1990 he transferred to the philosophy department of the University of New South Wales where he remained until his retirement in mid-2021.

Editor-in-chief
From December 2013 until March 2022 he was the editor-in-chief of the Australasian Journal of Philosophy, a prestigious English-language philosophy journal continuously published since 1923.

He is also the editor-in-chief of the Cambridge University Press Elements in Epistemology series and the Bloomsbury Publishing Critical Introductions to Contemporary Epistemology series.

Awards
In 2011 he was elected a fellow of the Australian Academy of the Humanities (FAHA).

Notes

References

 Hetherington, S.C. (1983a), "Tooley's Theory of Laws of Nature", Canadian Journal of Philosophy, Vol.13, No.1, (January 1983), pp. 101–106. 
 Hetherington, S.C. (1983b), Epistemic Foundationalism, B.Phil. dissertation, University of Oxford. SOLO catalogue entry
 Hetherington, S.C. (1984a), "Parsons and Possible Objects", Australasian Journal of Philosophy, Vol.62, No.3, (September 1984), pp. 246–254.  
 Hetherington, S.C. (1984b), "A Note on Inherence", Ancient Philosophy, Vol.4, No.2, (October 1984), pp. 218–223. 
 Hetherington, S.C. (1987), Narcissistic Epistemology, Ph.D. dissertation, University of Pittsburgh. PittCat catalogue entry
 Hetherington, S.C. (1988), "More on Possible Objects", Australasian Journal of Philosophy, Vol.66, No.1, (March 1988), pp. 96–100.

External links
 Stephen Hetherington's personal web-site -- includes details of most of his published works.

1959 births
Living people
Australian puppeteers
20th-century Australian philosophers
21st-century Australian philosophers
Analytic philosophers
Epistemologists
Metaphysicians
University of Sydney alumni
Alumni of the University of Oxford
Alumni of New College, Oxford
University of Pittsburgh alumni
West Virginia University faculty
Academic staff of the University of New South Wales
Fellows of the Australian Academy of the Humanities
People educated at Fort Street High School